Jason Paul London (born November 7, 1972) is an American actor, known for his roles as Randall "Pink" Floyd in director Richard Linklater's film Dazed and Confused (1993), as Jesse in The Rage: Carrie 2 (1999) and as Rick Rambis in Out Cold (2001).

Personal life
London was born in San Diego, the son of Deborah "Debbie" London (née Osborn), a waitress, and Frank London, a sheet metal worker. He was raised in Wanette, Oklahoma, and in DeSoto, Texas. His identical twin brother Jeremy is also an actor. In 2003, the two acted together in an episode of 7th Heaven titled "Smoking". Jeremy was Jason's stunt double in The Man in the Moon (1991).

London married actress Charlie Spradling in 1997. The couple had a daughter, Cooper. They divorced in 2006.

In November 2010, London became engaged to actress Sofia Karstens. They married on July 16, 2011 at the home of his wife's parents, William and Judith Karstens, in North Hero, Vermont.

Career
London has enjoyed success starring mostly as a rebellious, edgy young addict in feature films such as Broken Vessels (1998) and $pent (2000). He starred as Jason in the NBC miniseries Jason and the Argonauts (2000). He also starred in Poor White Trash (2000) playing sleazy ladies' man Brian Ross.

London portrayed Mark, the local newspaper editor, in the Hallmark Channel television movie, The Wishing Well (2010), which also starred Jordan Ladd and Ernest Borgnine.

In addition to his film and TV work, London also appeared in Aerosmith's 1993 video Amazing with Alicia Silverstone.

Filmography

References

External links
 
 
 

1972 births
Living people
American male film actors
American male television actors
Identical twin male actors
American twins
20th-century American male actors
21st-century American male actors